The Second League of Serbia and Montenegro was the second tier of the football league system in Serbia and Montenegro, one level below the First League of Serbia and Montenegro.

History
Formed in 1992 after the breakup of Yugoslavia, it consisted of a single league for the first four seasons of its formation before splitting into regional leagues from 1996. In 2004 the league was divided into two groups, Group Serbia and Group Montenegro. In 2005, Second League was split into the Serbian First League and the Montenegrin First League, one year before the split of the country.

From 1992 to 1996, the division was split into two groups of 10; Group A (known as IIA) for the top seeded teams and Group B (IIB) for the other teams. After the first half of the season, when all teams have played each other twice in their respective group, the bottom four teams of the IIA group are replaced with the top four teams of IIB for the second half of the season. At the end of the season, performance-based bonus points are applied and the standings from both groups are collated to determine the champions, promotion and relegation, and which group the remaining teams will start next season in.

The two-group format was scrapped in 1996 and the division was split geographically into parallel leagues, starting with Eastern and Western sections until 1999. A Northern section was included to the tier in 1999 and in 2000, a Southern section was added containing only Montenegrin teams.

List of champions

1992–1996: Second League

1996–1999: Second League – East / West

1999–2000: Second League – North / East / West

2000–2004: Second League – North / East / South / West

2004–2005: Second League – Serbia / Montenegro

2005–2006: First League – Serbia / Montenegro

 

  
Sports leagues established in 1992
Recurring events disestablished in 2006
Football in Serbia and Montenegro
Defunct football leagues in Montenegro
Defunct football leagues in Serbia
Defunct second level football leagues in Europe